This is a list of notable events in country music that took place in 1965.

Events
 January — Leo Fender, founder of Fender Guitars, sells his company to a subsidiary of Columbia Records for $13 million.
 February 17 — "The Tennessee Waltz" is declared the state song of Tennessee.
 October — Country Music Association president Tex Ritter awards Leo Fender the President's Award for "outstanding contributions to the sound of country music."

No dates
 The Vietnam War, which by now was making daily headlines, brings about the second wave of patriotic-themed songs. One of the first big songs was Johnnie Wright's "Hello Vietnam," a No. 1 hit in October. Late in the year, Dave Dudley records and releases "What We're Fighting For," an early response to the growing number of anti-Vietnam War protests.
The trend continues through the rest of the 1960s and early 1970s, with songs such as "Distant Drums" by Jim Reeves; "The Ballad of the Green Berets" by Staff Sgt. Barry Sadler; "Dear Uncle Sam" by Loretta Lynn; and others. By the late 1960s, the tone of the songs became darker, most notably the Mel Tillis-penned "Ruby, Don't Take Your Love To Town" (first a hit for Johnny Darrell, but more famously in 1969 by Kenny Rogers and the First Edition).
 Country singer Merle Haggard marries fellow country singer and former wife of Buck Owens, Bonnie Owens, they will stay married until their divorce in 1978 but go on to be great friends and Owens will continue to tour with Haggard until her death in 2006.
 Dolly Parton signs her first national recording contract with Monument Records. Initially pitched to the teen market as a bubblegum pop singer, she makes her first Billboard magazine chart appearance, peaking at No. 8 on the Bubbling Under Hot 100 chart in October with a cover of The Tune Weavers' "Happy, Happy Birthday Baby." A second single, "Busy Signal", is released in December but does not reach any of the Billboard charts. Also during the year, she writes "Put It Off Until Tomorrow", recording both a solo version and backing Bill Phillips on his own version, the latter which became a hit in 1966 and would lead to her being allowed to change her style from pop to country (a reverse of what would happen a decade later, after she had become a superstar).
 Ernest Tubb debuts his new weekly TV show, which airs in syndication through 1969, mainly in southern U.S. markets. The show features his backing band the Texas Troubadours, and regular vocalists Jack Greene and Cal Smith.

Top hits of the year

Number one hits

United States
(as certified by Billboard)

Notes
1^ No. 1 song of the year, as determined by Billboard.
2^ Song dropped from No. 1 and later returned to top spot.
A^ First Billboard No. 1 hit for that artist.
B^ Last Billboard No. 1 hit for that artist.
C^ Only Billboard No. 1 hit for that artist to date.

Canada
(as certified by RPM)

Notes
2^ Song dropped from No. 1 and later returned to top spot.
A^ First RPM No. 1 hit for that artist.
B^ Last RPM No. 1 hit for that artist.
C^ Only RPM No. 1 hit for that artist.

Other major hits

Singles released by American artists

Singles released by Canadian artists

Top new album releases

Other Album Releases

Births
 January 20 — John Michael Montgomery, honky tonk-styled singer of the 1990s and 2000s (decade); younger brother of Eddie Montgomery (of Montgomery Gentry).
 May 13 — Lari White, country singer of the 1990s (died 2018).
 July 16 — Craig Morgan, singer-songwriter since the 2000s (decade).
 August 7 — Raul Malo, lead singer of the alternative country band The Mavericks.
 August 28 — Shania Twain, mega country star since the latter half of the 1990s.

Deaths
 June 20 — Ira Louvin, 41, tenor half of 2001 Country Music Hall of Fame inductees The Louvin Brothers.

Country Music Hall of Fame Inductees
Ernest Tubb (1914–1984)

Major awards

Grammy Awards
Best Country and Western Vocal Performance, Female — "Queen of the House", Jody Miller
Best Country and Western Vocal Performance, Male — "King of the Road", Roger Miller
Best Country and Western Single — "King of the Road", Roger Miller
Best Country and Western Album — The Return of Roger Miller, Roger Miller
Best Country and Western Artist — The Statler Brothers

Academy of Country Music
Top Male Vocalist — Buck Owens
Top Female Vocalist — Bonnie Owens
Top Vocal Duo — Merle Haggard and Bonnie Owens
Top New Male Vocalist — Merle Haggard
Top New Female Vocalist — Kay Adams

Further reading
Kingsbury, Paul, "The Grand Ole Opry: History of Country Music. 70 Years of the Songs, the Stars and the Stories," Villard Books, Random House; Opryland USA, 1995
Kingsbury, Paul, "Vinyl Hayride: Country Music Album Covers 1947–1989," Country Music Foundation, 2003
Millard, Bob, "Country Music: 70 Years of America's Favorite Music," HarperCollins, New York, 1993
Whitburn, Joel, "Top Country Songs 1944–2005 – 6th Edition." 2005.

Other links
Country Music Association
Inductees of the Country Music Hall of Fame

External links
Country Music Hall of Fame

Country
Country music by year